King Kobra is an American heavy metal band founded by drummer Carmine Appice after his tenure with Ozzy Osbourne from 1983 to 1984.

History
For their first two albums, the band consisted of four relatively unknown musicians: vocalist Marcie Free, guitarist David Michael-Philips, guitarist Mick Sweda, and bassist Johnny Rod. After two albums on Capitol Records—Ready to Strike (November 9, 1985) and Thrill of a Lifetime (1986)—and the independent release King Kobra III in 1988, Appice decided to dissolve the band and join guitarist John Sykes for his Blue Murder project in 1989.

A new King Kobra emerged in 2010 with Carmine Appice on drums, Paul Shortino taking over vocal duties, Mick Sweda on guitar, David Henzerling (a.k.a. David Michael-Philips) on guitar, and Johnny Rod on bass. This lineup released the self-titled album King Kobra in 2011 on Frontiers Records and another album in 2013, titled King Kobra II.

The band went on hiatus following the release of their 2013 album, largely due to the other commitments of the individual band members, They played live gigs again in 2016 without Mick Sweda.

Band members

Current members 
Paul Shortino – lead vocals, guitar (2010–present)
David Michael-Phillips – guitar, backing vocals, keyboards, synthesizers (1983–1989, 2010–present)
Johnny Rod – bass (1983–1986, 2010–present)
Carmine Appice – drums, backing vocals (1983–1989, 2000–2001, 2010-present)

Former members 
Marcie Free – lead vocals (1983–1986)
Mike Wolf – guitar (1983)
Mick Sweda – guitar, backing vocals, synthesizers (1983–1987, 2000–2001, 2010–2016)
Marq Torien – lead vocals (1987)
Lonnie Vencent – bass (1986–1987)
Larry Hart – bass (1987–1989)
Jeff Northrup – guitar (1987–1989)
Johnny Edwards – lead vocals (1987–1989)
Kelly Keeling – bass, lead vocals, guitars, keyboards (2000–2001)
Steve Fister – guitar (2000–2001)

Timeline

Discography

Studio albums
Ready to Strike (1985)
Thrill of a Lifetime (1986)
King Kobra III (1988)
King Kobra (2011)
King Kobra II (2013)

Compilation albums
The Lost Years (1999)
Hollywood Trash (2001)
Number One (2005 - Re-release of The Lost Years)

Soundtrack appearances
"Iron Eagle (Never Say Die)" was included in the soundtrack album from the 1986 movie Iron Eagle.
Song credits: Jake Hooker-Duane Hitchings - 1986 - Capitol Records.
"Hunger", covered by King Kobra but written by Kick Axe (listed as "Spectre General"), was featured in The Transformers: The Movie, and included on the soundtrack album.
"Mean Street Machine" & "Redline", were featured in RoadKill (video game) on radio station 69.3 QQQQ

Notes
 Rod left the band and joined W.A.S.P. in 1986.
 Torien, Sweda, and Vincent left to play together in the band BulletBoys.
 Free went on to form the bands known as Signal (EMI Records), and Unruly Child (Atlantic/Interscope Records). After coming to terms with her gender dysphoria in 1993 she is now known as Marcie Free.

References

External links
 Historical Interview with King Kobra Guitarist

Capitol Records artists
Frontiers Records artists
Glam metal musical groups from California
Hard rock musical groups from California